Maksim Zuyev (born November 11, 1975 in Kaliningrad – died March 18, 2010) was a journalist and blogger who spent his entire life in Kaliningrad promoting human rights.

Death
On March 13, 2010, Zuyev disappeared from his apartment in Kaliningrad. His body was subsequently discovered on March 18 with "multiple stab wounds" as the apparent cause of death. Maksim had been vocal about the Russian federal governments' intrusive import tariffs on the city of Kaliningrad. Zuyev's murder occurred during the same week of March 20 that saw massive protests being held by human rights leaders in Kaliningrad and across Russia.

List of awards and positions

Co
Jury Regional Internet contest, The Baltic Wide Web (2000)

Producer 
I Regional Internet Festival "Amber string" (2003)
II Regional Internet Festival "Amber string" (2007)
Annual Regional Internet-parties (2004, 2005, 2006, 2007)

Judge 
Nationwide Internet contest "Golden Site" (2003)

Jury
Irkutsk Regional Internet contest (2003)
Rostov Regional Internet contest (2003)
Nationwide Internet contest "Golden Site" (2002)
International Internet-competition "Golden Spider" (2002)
Rostov Regional Internet contest (2001)

Member 
Journalists' Union of Russia
Russia Mediasoyuz

Winner 
Award Interior Minister (1999)

References

External links
Maxim Zuev's LiveJournal Profile (Kenig) 
Maxim Zuev's LiveJournal 

1975 births
2010 deaths
Russian journalists